The New Hebron Baptist Church in Concord, Georgia was listed on the National Register of Historic Places in 2017.

The church was organized in 1907; it had 31 charter members.

The building,  was built within 30 days during the summer of 1908.  Its foundation is brick and mortar pillars; it has a  interior ceiling.

References

National Register of Historic Places in Pike County, Georgia
Baptist churches in Georgia (U.S. state)
Churches on the National Register of Historic Places in Georgia (U.S. state)
Churches completed in 1908